Fata or FATA may refer to:

People
Arthur Fata (born 1963), Zimbabwean sculptor
Rico Fata (born 1980), Canadian ice-hockey player
Drew Fata (born 1983), Canadian ice-hockey player, brother of Rico
Farid Fata (born 1965), American oncologist convicted of large-scale medical fraud
Fata Orlović (born 1942), Bosniak woman involved in land lawsuit
Fata Omanović (born 1883), Bosniak historical figure
Fata Salkunič (born 1991), Slovenian footballer
Fata-a-iki (died 1896), king of Niue
Fata Sini (born 1966), Samoan rugby footballer

Places

Federally Administered Tribal Areas, a semi-autonomous tribal region in northwestern Pakistan 1947–2018
FATA Development Authority
Federally Administered Tribal Areas cricket team
FATA University
Fata Kot Taja, Bhawana Tehsil, Pakistan
Fata,Vedea, Argeș, Romania

Other uses
Dalmat (yacht), which carried the name Fata between 1941 and 1943
From Autumn to Ashes, an American post-hardcore band 
FATA (hard disk drive)
Federal Air Transport Agency, of Russia

See also

Fatah, a Palestinian political party
Faţa (disambiguation)
Fate (disambiguation)
Fata Morgana (disambiguation)